Kodandarama Temple is a Hindu temple located in Gollala Mamidada in Kakinada district of Andhra Pradesh, India. The temple is dedicated to Rama, the seventh incarnation of Vishnu. It was built on the banks of Tulyabhaga (Antharvahini), a tributary of Godavari. The temple is notable for its unique architecture and two huge gopurams which stand at 160–170 feet (49–52 m) and 200–210 feet (61–64 m). The temple gopurams are adorned with intricately carved statues depicting scenes from Ramayana, Mahabharata, and Bhagavatam.

The construction of the temple began in 1889 when brothers Dwarampudi Subbi Reddy and Rami Reddy donated land and built a small temple with wooden idols of Rama and Sita. A larger temple was built in 1939. The two gopurams were constructed in 1948–50 and 1956–58.

The temple is also known as 'Chinna Bhadradi' or the 'Little Bhadrachalam'. It is one of the two most popular Rama temples in Andhra Pradesh along with Kodandarama temple in Vontimitta.

Sri Rama Navami is the most prominent festival celebrated at the temple and features an annual wedding ceremony of Rama and Sita. Other important festivals celebrated at the temple are Vaikunta Ekadasi and Vijayadasami.

Location 
Kodandarama Temple is situated in Gollala Mamidada village in Pedapudi Mandal of Kakinada district in Andhra Pradesh. The temple is located at a distance of 25 km from Kakinada, 45 km from Rajahmundry, and 180 km from Visakhapatnam. Also located in the same village is the Suryanarayana Temple, a Sun temple.

The temple 
The construction of the temple began in 1889 by brothers Dwarampudi Subbi Reddy and Rami Reddy who donated land and built a small temple with wooden idols of Rama and Sita. A larger temple was built in 1939. The east and west gopurams were built in 1948–50 and 1956–58 respectively. The east-facing gopuram is 160–170 feet high and has nine storeys and five kalasams. The west-facing gopuram is 200–210 feet high and has 11 storeys and five kalasams.

A mirror hall (addala mandapam in Telugu) was built between the two mandapams, above the sanctum sanctorum in 1975. The mirror hall has a stucco relief of Sri Rama Pattabhishekam (coronation of Rama) on one side and of Rama blessing Hanuman on the other side. The garbhalayam contains the idols of Rama, Lakshmana, and Sita along with Hanuman.

There are intricately carved statues depicting scenes from Ramayana, Mahabharata, and Bhagavatam on the four sides of the gopurams in each floor. The Sikhara of the temple is carved with statues depicting Bala Ramayana (childhood of Rama). Devotees can reach the top storey of the gopurams through a 300-step climb.

Around 200 metres from the temple is a Pushkarini, a small pond of water sourced from the Tulyabhaga river. Water from the Pushkarini is used in various religious ceremonies at the temple.

Festivals 
Sri Rama Navami is the most prominent festival celebrated at the temple. It features an annual wedding ceremony of Rama and Sita. The District Collector along with the local MLA  and their spouses offer silk clothes to the presiding deities on the occasion. After the wedding ceremony, the murtis are taken in a procession across the streets. A grand offering of food (Annadanam) is made to the devotees on the occasion.

Other important festivals celebrated at the temple are Vaikunta Ekadasi and Vijayadasami.

Gallery

References 

Hindu temples in Kakinada district
Tourist attractions in Andhra Pradesh
Rama temples